Priyanka Bora (born 1994) is an Indian television actress and model. She made her Indian television debut in the Season 8 of the reality show MTV Splitsvilla. She is known for her playing Prachi in Siddhi Vinayak and Aarti in Ragini MMS: Returns.

Career
Born in Assam, Bora also worked as an airline crew member while making her debut in the reality show MTV Splitsvilla. She also participated in modelling shows in North East and later debuted in Hindi television in the soap opera Siddhi Vinayak.

Bora plays the role of Aarti in the web-series Ragini MMS: Returns. She also debuted in Assamese television in the series Mur Minoti Tora Hoi Jodi on Rang TV.

Filmography

Television

Web series

References

External links

Living people
1994 births
People from Dhubri district
Actresses from Assam
Female models from Assam
Indian television actresses
Indian soap opera actresses
Indian web series actresses
Actresses in Hindi television
Actresses in Assamese television
21st-century Indian actresses